The freshwater blenny ((Salaria fluviatilis) is a species of fish in the family Blenniidae. It is found in African rivers and brooks in Algeria and Morocco flowing to the Mediterranean Sea.  In Europe it is widespread in the freshwaters of Albania, Croatia, France, Greece, Italy, Montenegro, Spain and Portugal, while in Asia it is in Turkey and Israel.  This species reaches a length of  TL. This taxon may be paraphyletic as the populations in Turkey and Israel are more genetically divergent from other populations of freshwater blenny than the Trichonis blenny and it has been suggested that the population in Kinneret Lake in Israel has been proposed as a new species.

References

freshwater blenny
Freshwater fish of Europe
Freshwater fish of North Africa
Freshwater fish of Western Asia
Freshwater fish of Turkey
freshwater blenny
Taxa named by Ignacio Jordán Claudio de Asso y del Río
Taxonomy articles created by Polbot